Moshe J. Kotlarsky is an Orthodox Hasidic rabbi who serves as Vice Chairman of Merkos L'Inyonei Chinuch, the educational arm of the Chabad-Lubavitch movement which in turn oversees over 5,000 religious and educational institutions worldwide. Kotlarsky is a key movement fundraiser, and a powerful figure in the outreach operation. He also heads the Chabad on Campus International Foundation which is active on over two hundred and thirty campuses worldwide, and serves as chairman of the Rohr Jewish Learning Institute.

Activities

Global Ambassador 
Shortly after his marriage, Kotlarsky began working for Merkos, the Chabad division responsible for outreach, on the cusp of an explosion in the number of volunteer Chabad emissaries around the world. He started by travelling to outlying Jewish communities in 1968 - identifying their needs and working with local community leaders to plan future Chabad centers. Fusing organizational abilities and fundraising skills, he became a crucial resource - connecting field operatives with Chabad headquarters.

The network he serves as Vice Chairman of, oversees about four thousand institutions in a hundred countries. Kotlarsky presides over the massive Kinus Hashluchim, the annual international conference of Chabad emissaries which takes place in New York City. He serves as director of the conference, where more than 4,000 emissaries and their families participate in workshops, social events, a shared Shabbat and a banquet. He also serves as one of Chabad's top spokespersons, and oversees religious and educational institutions in over a hundred countries.
Kotlarsky has also been named in various published rankings of influential Jewish leaders including the Algemeiner Journals 'Jewish 100' and the Forward 50.

Fundraiser 
Kotlarsky has cultivated Chabad's relationship with many philanthropists worldwide, including the late Sammy Rohr and his son George, the investor who has significantly funded Chabad's expansion on college campuses and in Eastern Europe, among other places. His office administers the 'Bogolubov Simcha Fund' which disburses grants to Chabad representatives worldwide for family related expenses. He also facilitates grants for individual emissaries and their community projects through his contacts with philanthropists.

Personal life 
Kotlarsky was born and raised in the Crown Heights section of Brooklyn in 1949. His father, Rabbi Tzvi Yosef (Hershel) Kotlarsky (d. 2008), was a native of Otwosk, Poland who spent the World War II years in Shanghai. The elder Rabbi Kotlarsky was a member of the administration of Yeshivas Tomchei Temimim, the main Lubavitch yeshiva in Crown Heights, Brooklyn, for over 40 years.

Kotlarsky is married to Rivka Kazen, one of six daughters of Rabbi Shlomo Schneur Zalman Kazen, who opened the first Jewish girls school in France in 1946 at the directive of the previous Lubavitcher Rebbe, Rabbi Yosef Yitzchak Schneersohn. Rivka was born in Paris, where the school was located and lived there until 1953 when Kazen moved his growing family to America.

His brother-in-law was Rabbi Yosef Yitzchak Kazen who was became a pioneer in the use of internet and email technology to spread Jewish knowledge.

After his marriage, Kotlarsky settled in Crown Heights, Brooklyn where he lives with his wife and where they raised their nine children.

Kotlarsky's son, Rabbi Mendy Kotlarsky serves as the director of Merkos 302 and as president of Chabad's international Cteen program.

References

External links 
 New Year's Greeting 5771 from Rabbi Moshe Kotlorsky
 "A Candid Interview with Rabbi Moshe Kotlarsky" Intermountain Jewish News, June 13, 2011

Chabad-Lubavitch rabbis
Hasidic rabbis
20th-century American rabbis
21st-century American rabbis
Living people
1949 births